The 1959 Oklahoma State Cowboys baseball team represented the Oklahoma State University in the 1959 NCAA University Division baseball season. The team was coached by Toby Greene in his 16th season at Oklahoma State.

The Cowboys won the College World Series, defeating the Arizona Wildcats in the championship game.

Roster

Schedule

! style="background:black;color:white;"| Regular Season
|-

|- align="center" bgcolor="ddffdd"
| March 18 || at  || 9-3 || 1–0 || –
|- align="center" bgcolor="ffdddd"
| March 19 || at Rice || 5-6 || 1–1 || –
|- align="center" bgcolor="ddffdd"
| March 20 || at  || 7-2 || 2–1 || –
|- align="center" bgcolor="ddffdd"
| March 21 || at Houston || 7-4 || 3–1 || –
|-

|- align="center" bgcolor="ddffdd"
| April 10 ||  || 9-0 || 4–1 || 1-0
|- align="center" bgcolor="ddffdd"
| April 11 || Kansas || 13-2 || 5–1 || 2-0
|- align="center" bgcolor="ddffdd"
| April 11 || Kansas || 6-0 || 6–1 || 3-0
|- align="center" bgcolor="ddffdd"
| April 20 || at  || 9-3 || 7–1 || 4-0
|- align="center" bgcolor="ddffdd"
| April 20 || at Oklahoma || 8-1 || 8–1 || 5-0
|- align="center" bgcolor="ddffdd"
| April 21 || at Oklahoma || 6-5 || 9–1 || 6-0
|- align="center" bgcolor="ddffdd"
| April 24 ||  || 19-1 || 10–1 || 7-0
|- align="center" bgcolor="ddffdd"
| April 25 || Kansas State || 15-0 || 11–1 || 8-0
|- align="center" bgcolor="ddffdd"
| April 25 || Kansas State || 8-3 || 12–1 || 9-0
|-

|- align="center" bgcolor="ffdddd"
| May 1 || at  || 2-7 || 12–2 || 9-1
|- align="center" bgcolor="ddffdd"
| May 2 || at Nebraska || 4-1 || 13–2 || 10-1
|- align="center" bgcolor="ddffdd"
| May 2 || at Nebraska || 5-1 || 14–2 || 11-1
|- align="center" bgcolor="ddffdd"
| May 8 || at  || 10-2 || 15–2 || 12-1
|- align="center" bgcolor="ddffdd"
| May 9 || at Colorado || 6-5 || 16–2 || 13-1
|- align="center" bgcolor="ddffdd"
| May 9 || at Colorado || 7-2 || 17–2 || 14-1
|- align="center" bgcolor="ffdddd"
| May 15 ||  || 1-4 || 17–3 || 14-2
|- align="center" bgcolor="ffdddd"
| May 16 || Iowa State || 6-9 || 17–4 || 14-3
|- align="center" bgcolor="ddffdd"
| May 16 || Iowa State || 3-0 || 18–4 || 15-3
|- align="center" bgcolor="ddffdd"
| May 22 ||  || 1-0 || 19–4 || 16-3
|- align="center" bgcolor="ddffdd"
| May 23 || Missouri || 2-1 || 20–4 || 17-3
|-

|-
! style="background:black;color:white;"| Post-Season
|-

|- align="center" bgcolor="ddffdd"
| May 29 || vs.  || 7-6 || 21–4
|- align="center" bgcolor="ddffdd"
| May 30 || vs. Bradley || 6-2 || 22–4
|-

|- align="center" bgcolor="ddffdd"
| June 12 || vs. Western Michigan || Rosenblatt Stadium || 10–2 || 23–4
|- align="center" bgcolor="ddffdd"
| June 14 || vs. Penn State || Rosenblatt Stadium || 10–6 || 24–4
|- align="center" bgcolor="ffdddd"
| June 15 || vs. Arizona || Rosenblatt Stadium || 3–5 || 24–5
|- align="center" bgcolor="ddffdd"
| June 16 || vs. Penn State || Rosenblatt Stadium || 4–3 || 25–5
|- align="center" bgcolor="ddffdd"
| June 17 || vs.  || Rosenblatt Stadium || 4–0 || 26–5
|- align="center" bgcolor="ddffdd"
| June 18 || vs. Arizona || Rosenblatt Stadium || 5–3 || 27–5
|-

Awards and honors 
Bruce Andrew
All-Big Eight  
College World Series All-Tournament Team

Jim Dobson
College World Series Most Outstanding Player  
All-Big Eight

Ben Bancroft
All-America Second Team
All-Big Eight

Joel Horlen
All-America Second Team 
All-Big Eight  
College World Series All-Tournament Team

Connie McIlvoy
College World Series All-Tournament Team

References

College World Series seasons
NCAA Division I Baseball Championship seasons
Big Eight Conference baseball champion seasons
Oklahoma State
Oklahoma State Cowboys baseball seasons